The original Rowsley railway station was opened in 1849 by the Manchester, Buxton, Matlock and Midlands Junction Railway to serve the village of Rowsley in Derbyshire.

Opening
The original plan for the line was to meet the proposed Ambergate, Nottingham, Boston and Eastern Junction Railway at Ambergate to provide a route from Manchester to the East Coast.  The Midland Railway bought shares in the line as it saw an opportunity to run through trains to London. The Manchester and Birmingham Railway, which would  provide access from Stockport to Manchester over its own line, supported the project for the same reason. However, in 1846 it merged into the new London and North Western Railway which was opposed to any competition into London. The station, nonetheless, had a busy trade with some sixty or seventy thousand visitors to Chatsworth House each year.

The stalemate lasted until 1862 when the Midland realigned the track and moved to a new station as it extended the line into Buxton. The original station building, which had been designed by Joseph Paxton, was used as a goods office until closure in 1967. It still exists within a shopping centre. The new station was particularly grand, with large first- and third-class facilities and, unusually, in 1891, a subway between the platforms to cater for dignitaries visiting the Duke of Devonshire.

The through line
Finally in 1867 the line reached Manchester and became part of one of the Midland's most prized assets. Besides the London expresses, some of which called at the station, there was substantial goods traffic.  This included limestone southwards from the Peak District and, in particular, coal northward from the Nottinghamshire and Derbyshire Coalfield.

Northwards from Rowsley, the line climbed over 600 feet in fourteen miles to its summit at Peak Forest with punishing gradients. A large motive power depot and marshalling yard was opened in 1877 to provide banking engines and to split trains as necessary. This was not so much due to the lack of powerful engines, but because of the need to limit the strain on wagon couplings. Thus, in theory, a class 8F locomotive could haul 37 wagons, but a banker would still have to be provided. Moreover, account had to be taken of the braking capacity on the downhill stretch towards Chinley, such that larger engines were no more capable than the ubiquitous "4Fs".

The Midland Railway became part of the London, Midland and Scottish Railway during the Grouping of 1923.

Dairy
The company were also granted dedicated use of one of the five newly created sidings. Express built a facility that included a milk cooling depot, spray, pond condenser and filter plant. Milk Tank Wagons were normally attached to the 5.18pm local to Derby for Cricklewood, or the 10.15pm express freight to Brent sidings. In the 12 months to the end of May 1934, the LMS noted that the carriage value of milk forwarded from Rowsley was £16,886.

Closure 

The station closed in 1967, the line closing the following year, and subsequently the track was removed. The line has since been reopened in stages from Matlock by Peak Rail as a heritage railway, reaching its current present terminus at a new station at Rowsley South (which opened in 1997).

Restoration plans 

There are plans to reconstruct the line from the current terminus at Rowsley South through Rowsley station itself to as close to Bakewell as possible (this may include rebuilding and full restoration of the Rowsley station site itself as Phase 1 of the project).

Peak Rail have secured a 99-year lease on the "currently disused" trackbed up to the A6 road at the site of the former station site "opposite the village of the same name".

When Peak Rail has extended its services into the station site at Rowsley itself, the current terminus at Rowsley South will close as it is only half a mile away.

Stationmasters
Henry Swift ????–1852
William Beck c.1855–1875
Amos Reed 1875–1890 (afterwards stationmaster at Hitchin)
Thomas Pitt 1890–1897
Samuel Pitt 1897–1907 (formerly stationmaster at Spondon, afterwards stationmaster at Buxton)
James Sparling 1907–1913 (formerly stationmaster at Nottingham Road, Derby, afterwards stationmaster at Melton Mowbray)
J.W. Griffin 1913–1920 (afterwards stationmaster at Redditch)
W.E. Heming 1920–1925
Henry Ernest Fews 1925 – ca. 1937 – ????
George Raymond Hemming ????–1947 (afterwards stationmaster at Spondon)
Derrick Hoyle ????–1963 (also stationmaster at Darley Dale from 1958)

Route

References

Disused railway stations in Derbyshire
Former Midland Railway stations
Railway stations in Great Britain opened in 1849
Railway stations in Great Britain closed in 1862
Railway stations in Great Britain opened in 1862
Railway stations in Great Britain closed in 1967
Beeching closures in England
1866 establishments in England